"Umlilo" is a single by a South African DJ professionally known as DJ Zinhle, released on , the single features vocals from female singer Rethabile Khumalo with production from Mvzzle.
Umlilo has been certified multi-platinum and within its first three months, it reached over 5.1 million streams.

Background 
When translated, “Umlilo” means fire, translated from isiZulu to English. In the jam, three artists are grateful for what God has done to them. He has opened their eyes and ears, and they can speak because of “God’s fire alone. It is also essential to point out that each of the three artists chose their lines well.

Mvzzle contacted renowned DJ and entrepreneur, DJ Zinhle with two beats, one of which is now the smash hit ‘Umlilo’ featuring Rethabile – who had earlier DM’d, DJ Zinhle on Instagram proposing a collaboration with her, one thing led to the other and single was produced. Zinhle, in an edition of Red Bull Live With, explained to Mo Flava about the exact meaning behind the hit song.

"There has been a big debate about 'Umlilo' because it's such a big club or party song and people don't know that its actually a sing that praises God. It talks about the wonders of God's love and it is based on Bible scriptures which is amazing", explained the DJ.

The single was released through Universal Music South Africa on behalf of Kalawa Jazmee.

Composition and lyrics 
"Umlilo" is a house track that has a touch of dance/electronic.

The song features an "upbeat tempo beat" with Rethabile's vocals quoting a Bible verse

Critical reception 
The female producer DJ Zinhle was accused of buying nominations for the song and she had to clap back to clarify the mistakes made by the media.

Accolades 
The hit-single went on to receive triple-platinum plaques, and nominated  for Record Of The Year (fan-voted) at 26th South African Music Awards. The single won a NAMA (award).

Certifications and sales

Music video 
The video depicts the female DJ alongside a couple of dancers, Rethabile singing on the microphone and Mvzzle behind the decks

In celebration of the song's success, DJ Zinhle released a second [Platinum] video for Umlilo in December and just a few months later, the video has reached over 3 million views on YouTube.

References

External links 
  on Musixmatch

2019 singles
2019 songs
South African Music Awards